Honky Tonk Christmas is the fourth studio album and the first Christmas album by country music artist Alan Jackson, and was released on October 12, 1993. The title track, "A Holly Jolly Christmas" and "I Only Want You for Christmas" charted on the Hot Country Songs charts.

"Please, Daddy (Don't Get Drunk This Christmas)" was originally recorded by John Denver for his 1973 album Farewell Andromeda.  Jackson's version of "A Holly Jolly Christmas" first appeared on the soundtrack to the 1992 film Home Alone 2: Lost in New York, while "Santa's Gonna Come in a Pickup Truck" was also included on the 1994 Alvin and the Chipmunks album A Very Merry Chipmunk.

Track listing

Personnel

 Alan Jackson – lead vocals, backing vocals
 Vanessa Adiar – choir
 Harley Allen – mandolin
 Cindy Ashcraft – choir
 Ross Bagdasarian Jr. – speaking part
 Eddie Bayers – drums
 Ashley Berry – choir
 Mark Casstevens – banjo
 Angela Chancellor – choir
 Alvin & The Chipmunks – vocals on "Santa's Gonna Come in a Pickup Truck"
 Jennifer Cockrell – choir
 Eric Darken – percussion
 Stuart Duncan – fiddle, mandolin
 Joe Fisher – choir
 Rhonda Forlaw – choir
 Paul Franklin – pedal steel guitar
 Kelly Giedt – choir
 Dottie Hahn – choir
 Frank Hamlin – choir
 Chris Harris – backing vocals
 Mike Haynes – backing vocals
 Steve Hood – choir
 Jim Horn – saxophone
 Roy Huskey Jr. – bass
 Dick Kaiser – choir
 Janice Karmen – speaking part
 Wayne Kirkpatrick – backing vocals
 Alison Krauss – vocals on "The Angels Cried"
 Jimmy Kull – choir
 Brent Mason – electric guitar
 Richard Morris – choir
 Weldon Myrick – pedal steel guitar
 Kerri Pauley – choir
 Jon Robbin – choir
 Hargus "Pig" Robbins – piano, backing vocals
 Kara Ross – choir
 Bruce Rutherford – backing vocals
 John Wesley Ryles – backing vocals
 Roxane Stueve – choir
 Kris Sultemeir – choir
 Tom Thornton – choir
 Jim Vest – pedal steel guitar
 Bruce Watkins – acoustic guitar
 Biff Watson – acoustic guitar
 Keith Whitley – vocals on "There's a New Kid in Town"
 Glenn Worf – bass

Chart performance
Honky Tonk Christmas  peaked  at No. 42 on the U.S. Billboard 200, and No. 7 on the Top Country Albums. In January 1998, Honky Tonk Christmas was certified Platinum by the RIAA.  It has sold 1,324,800 copies in the U.S. as of November 2017.

Charts

Sales and Certifications

References

1993 Christmas albums
Alan Jackson albums
Arista Records Christmas albums
Christmas albums by American artists
Albums produced by Keith Stegall
Country Christmas albums